Rudolice is a village and administrative part of the city of Most, Czech Republic. As of 2021, it had 234 inhabitants.

History
The area has been inhabited since the neolithic age. The first written mention of Rudolice (as Rudolfsdorf) comes from 1298. Between 1298 and 1349, Osek Monastery bought out the estate and kept it until 1848.

Until the end of the 18th century Rudolice was a tiny hamlet; later, the number of inhabitants started to grow, peaking in the period of 1921 (389 inhabitants) – 1930 (1,279 inhabitants). In 1947 the village became part of the city of Most. Much of the housing was torn down during second half of the 1960s to make way for mining and transportation infrastructure.

References

External links
History of Rudolice and photos on zanikleobce.cz (in Czech)

Neighbourhoods in the Czech Republic
Populated places in Most District